Mala Rajya Laxmi Shah (born 23 August 1950) is a political and social worker, Member of Parliament elected from the Tehri Garhwal constituency in the Indian state of Uttarakhand being a Bhartiya Janata Party Leader and titular queen of erstwhile Tehri Garhwal kingdom which merged to India.

Early life and education
Mala Rajya Laxmi was born on 23 August 1950 at the Thapathali Durbar, Kathmandu, Nepal. She married Manujendra Shah Sahib Bahadur, Maharaja of Tehri Garhwal, on 7 February 1975 and has a daughter, Kshirya Kumari Devi (b. in 1976 in New Delhi).

Mala is an Intermediate and studied at Convent of Jesus and Mary, Pune and Ratna Rajya Laxmi College, Kathmandu.

Career
She was elected to the 15th Lok Sabha in a by-election and is a Member, BJP State Parliamentary Board in Uttarakhand.  She defeated Saket Bahuguna son of Vijay Bahuguna then chief minister of Uttarakhand and a candidate of Indian National Congress by a margin of over 22,000.
Mala Rajya Laxmi Shah is the daughter-in-law of erstwhile Tehri royal family scion Manabendra Shah, who represented the seat in Lok Sabha a record eight times.
She is the first woman elected to Lok Sabha from the state since its creation as a separate state on 9 November 2000.

References

External links 
 Uttarakhand: BJP wins Tehri Lok Sabha bypoll
 MP Track Record

People from New Tehri
India MPs 2009–2014
Women in Uttarakhand politics
Living people
Lok Sabha members from Uttarakhand
1950 births
Articles created or expanded during Women's History Month (India) - 2014
People from Kathmandu
India MPs 2014–2019
Bharatiya Janata Party politicians from Uttarakhand
21st-century Indian women politicians
21st-century Indian politicians
India MPs 2019–present
Ratna Rajya Laxmi Campus alumni